Othakkalmandapam (Otthakkālmaṇdapam) is a suburb of Coimbatore city in the Indian state of Tamil Nadu. The suburb is known locally as O.K. Mandapam or O.K.M. It is located outside the city limits, which recently merged with the Corporation of Coimbatore up to Eachanari. Othakkalmandapam is located outside the city limits of Coimbatore.It belongs to kinathukadavu constituency.

This place is located on the NH 209, 17 km away from Coimbatore Junction, towards Pollachi direction, Next closest town is Pollachi (26 km). In a 5 km radius, there are many engineering colleges & arts colleges are there, so that many other state students are staying in and around Othakkalmandapam for their studies. Therefore, Othakkalmandapam is known as the Engineering hub of Coimbatore.

Demographics

 India census, Othakkalmandapam had a population of 9681. Males constitute 51% of the population and females 49%. Othakkalmandapam has an average literacy rate of 70%, higher than the national average of 59.5%: male literacy is 78%, and female literacy is 61%. In Othakkalmandapam, 9% of the population is under 6 years of age.

Education
Colleges in and around Othakkalmandapam:
Karpagam Faculty of Medical Sciences & Research
Hindusthan College of Engineering & Technology
Hindusthan Institute of Technology
Karpagam College of Engineering
Karpagam Institute of Technology, Coimbatore
Karpagam Nursing College
Karpagam Arts & Science College
Karpagam Polytechnic College
D.J.Academy (Design/Management Studies/MCA/BCA)
Christ King Polytechnic College (Old name "CKIT" Christ the King Institute of Technology)
Coimbatore Marine College & Coimbatore Aeronautical College
Angappa Arts & Science College
Nallayan Kalluri (Christian Community)
Shri Nehru Maha Vidyalaya College of Arts & Sciences
Akshaya Management Studies (MBA/MCA)
SVS Engineering College
Sasi Creative school of Architecture and Design

Schools in and around Othakkalmandapam:
Govt. Hr. Sec. School
PMG Matric. Higher Sec. School, Othakkalmandapam
V. Gengusamy Naidu. Matric. Higher Sec. School
Vedanta Academy

References

Cities and towns in Coimbatore district
Suburbs of Coimbatore